Íþróttafélag Stúdenta, commonly known as ÍS, is an Icelandic multi-sport club based in Reykjavík, Iceland. It was founded by students of University of Iceland on 21 January 1928. Since its foundation, the club has been involved in various sports, most notably wrestling, basketball and volleyball.

History
Soon after its foundation, the club started with general gymnastics and wrestling exercises for students of the University of Iceland. The first chairman of the club was Þorgrímur V. Sigurðsson. The club thrived for the first few semesters and sent wrestlers to exhibitions competition at the international student sports tournament in Germany in 1929.

In the 1940s, the club hosted regular football matches with students from Menntaskólinn í Reykjavík, and in 1940 ÍS participated in the first Icelandic handball tournament. In those years, however, the name of the club was somewhat erratic and it was often called the University Sports Club or similar names.

Around 1940, the future of the club seemed bright. Alexander Jóhannesson, Rector of the University, was very interested in increasing the importance of sports within the university. There was talk of making sports a compulsory subject and that the school would nurture high-achieving athletes, as was the custom in American universities. Drawings were made for a sports hall for the school, which had become by far the largest in the country, as well as a swimming pool. Eventually, however, a much smaller gymnasium was built on the school grounds, and sports never made it to the curriculum.

ÍS was for years one of the strongest basketball teams in the country. Its women's team was one of the more successful teams in Icelandic basketball, winning three national championships and seven Icelandic Basketball Cups. Its men's team won the national championship once, in 1959, and the Icelandic Basketball Cup once, in 1978. The club also boasts a number of volleyball championships.

In 2002 the university stopped sponsoring the club which led to financial difficulties. Its men's basketball team folded after the 2005-2006 season and its women's team folded after 2006-2007 season when most of the players moved over to Valur's newly resurrected women's team. In recent years, the activities have decreased and ÍS no longer sends teams to the Icelandic tournaments.

Basketball

Men's basketball

Honours
Úrvalsdeild karla
 Winners (1): 1959

Icelandic Basketball Cup
 Winners (1): 1978

Division I
 Winners (4): 1966, 1968, 1971, 1984

European record

Notable players

Notable coaches
 Benedikt Jakobsson
 Birgir Örn Birgis (1977–1980)
 Guðni Ólafur Guðnason (1994–1996)

Women's basketball

Honours
Úrvalsdeild kvenna
 Winners (3): 1978, 1984, 1991

Icelandic Basketball Cup
 Winners (7): 1978, 1980, 1981, 1985, 1991, 2003, 2006

Icelandic Basketball Supercup
 Winners (1): 1998

Individual awards

Úrvalsdeild Women's Domestic Player of the Year
Alda Leif Jónsdóttir - 2002
Úrvalsdeild Women's Domestic All-First Team
Alda Leif Jónsdóttir - 1997, 1998, 1999, 2002, 2004, 2005
Signý Hermannsdóttir - 1999, 2005, 2006
Svandís Anna Sigurðardóttir - 2003
Lovísa Guðmundsdóttir - 2002
Vigdís Þórisdóttir - 1991, 1992
Hafdís Helgadóttir - 1991

Notable players

Notable coaches
  Dirk Dunbar (1977–1978)
  Trent Smock (1979–1980)
  Birgir Mikaelsson (1994–1995)
  Ívar Ásgrímsson

Volleyball

Men's volleyball 
 Icelandic champions: 10
 1970, 1971, 1975, 1976, 1978, 1988, 1992, 2000, 2001, 2002
 Icelanic Cup: 10
 1975, 1976, 1979, 1984, 1987, 1989, 1999, 2000, 2001, 2002

Women's volleyball 
 Icelandic champions: 8
 1982, 1985, 1986, 1990, 1992, 1994, 1997, 1999
 Icelanic Cup: 12
 1979, 1980, 1981, 1982, 1985, 1986, 1992, 1994, 1996, 1997, 1998, 1999

References

 
Basketball teams in Iceland